Crossotus stypticus is a species of beetle in the family Cerambycidae. It was described by Pascoe in 1869. It is known from Mozambique, Botswana, South Africa, Namibia, and Tanzania.

Subspecies
 Crossotus stypticus aethiops Distant, 1898
 Crossotus stypticus stypticus Pascoe, 1869

References

stypticus
Beetles described in 1869